The 21st Edition Vuelta a España (Tour of Spain), a long-distance bicycle stage race and one of the three grand tours, was held from 28 April to 15 May 1966. Jos van der Vleuten won the points classification and Gregorio San Miguel won the mountains classification.

Teams and riders

Route

Results

Final General Classification

References

Results on cyclebase.nl

External links
La Vuelta (Official site in Spanish, English, and French)

 
1966 in road cycling
1966
1966 in Spanish sport
1966 Super Prestige Pernod